Admiral Sir Charles Saumarez Daniel,  (23 June 1894 – 11 February 1981) was a Royal Navy officer who went on to be Third Sea Lord and Controller of the Navy.

Naval career
Educated at Southcliffe School in Filey, the Royal Naval College, Osborne, and the Royal Naval College, Dartmouth, Daniel was commissioned into the Royal Navy in 1912. He served in the First World War taking part in the Battle of Jutland in 1916.

He served in the Second World War initially as Captain (Destroyers) for the 8th Destroyer Flotilla and then, from 1940, as Director of Plans at the Admiralty. After the war, he became Third Sea Lord and Controller of the Navy and then, from 1949, Commandant of the Imperial Defence College before retiring in 1952.

In retirement he became Chairman of the Television Advisory Committee.

Family
In 1919, he married Marjory Katharine Wilson; they had one daughter. Following the death of his first wife, he married Beatrice Pendlebury Worsley, widow of his brother-in-law John Pares Wilson, in 1963.

References

|-

1894 births
1981 deaths
Graduates of Britannia Royal Naval College
Royal Navy admirals
Royal Navy officers of World War I
Royal Navy admirals of World War II
Knights Commander of the Order of the Bath
Commanders of the Order of the British Empire
Companions of the Distinguished Service Order
Lords of the Admiralty
People educated at the Royal Naval College, Osborne